The Griffon 2000 series is a light-weight hovercraft built in the United Kingdom by Griffon Hoverwork and used principally by military and rescue organisations.

Background
Griffon Hoverwork (GHL) of Hythe, England has designed, manufactured and operated hovercraft for over 40 years.

GHL was the first manufacturer to use turbo-diesel engines on hovercraft, which increases durability compared to conventional petrol engines when exposed to salt water conditions. The company produces an extensive range of hovercraft, with payloads between 0.38 and 12 tonnes.

Configuration
The 2000 series was introduced in the early 1990s. The 2000TD series is slightly smaller than the older SR.N6 popular with commercial and military services during the 1970s, and has largely replaced the older SR.N6 series in most of these roles. Because it is constructed almost entirely out of aluminium the 2000TDX is less than half the weight of the older SR.N6 hovercraft.

The 2400TD was designed in 2008 due to the popularity of the 2000 series. It has greater obstacle clearance, is capable of carrying a higher payload, and can reach higher speeds than the previous craft.

Commercial use
For eight years GHL operated a passenger service up and down the River Thames in London, and hovercraft were the only vehicles allowed to operate at high speed along the river, as they produce very little wash or wake.

Hovertravel currently uses a Griffon Hoverwork designed BHT craft to provide a passenger route between Southsea, Portsmouth and Ryde, Isle of Wight.

Société des Traversiers du Québec in Québec, Canada was provided in 2012 with a 2000TD to operate a passenger service between Pakuashipi and Saint-Augustin during the periods the ice bridge linking the two communities is not open.

Military use

Griffon Hoverwork hovercraft have been purchased by several armies, navies and paramilitary organisations throughout the World, and several remain on order. The hovercraft can be configured to carry troops or cargo, with optional extras such as armoured glass and ballistic protection.

 Belgian Army: 1 craft. Acquired in 1995. Exposed cargo deck only. Used for drone recovery and artillery range patrol. No weapons. Radical Decca, I-band radar.
 Barbara A 999
 Colombian Naval Infantry: 8 craft.
 ARC 331
 ARC 332
 ARC 333
 ARC 334
 ARC 335
 ARC 336
 ARC 337
 ARC 338
 Estonian Border Guard: 1 craft. Acquired in 1999. Capable of transporting 16 troops or 2 tons of equipment.
 PVH 1
 Finland: Border Guard: 7 craft. First craft acquired on 1 December 1994. Third craft acquired June 1995. Can be embarked in an LCU. Similar configuration to Estonian craft.
 Lithuanian Border Police: 1 craft. Acquired in 2000. Similar configuration to Estonian craft. Furuno 1000C, I-band radar.
 Christina
Pakistan Marines: 4 craft
 Peruvian Navy: 7 craft
 Polish Border Guard
 SG-411
 SG-412
 Swedish Coast Guard: First military version of the 2000TD series to be constructed. 2 crafts in operation delivered in 1993 (KVB 592) and 2011 (KVB 590). Similar configuration to Estonian craft. Furuno 7010D, I-band radar.
 KBV 590, based in Luleå
 KBV 592, based in Umeå
 Swedish Navy: 3 craft
 302
 303
 304
 United Kingdom: British Royal Marines: 4 craft LCAC(L).
 C 21
 C 22
 C 23
 C 24

Specifications
 Designer / Manufacturer: Griffon Hovercraft Ltd.
 Crew 3
 Dimensions
 Length 11.7 metres
 Width 5.9 metres
 full load displacement 3.5 tons
 Propulsion
 Motor: diesel engine
 Power: 1 Deutz diesel engine 350 horsepower for lift and propulsion
 Propellers: 1 three-bladed variable-pitch propeller
 Performance
 Speed 35 knots (at sea state 3)
 Range 450 miles at 35 knots
 Military Lift:
 Weapons
 1 7.62mm machine gun (not on Belgian craft)
 Radar
 Navigation: Various; I-band

References

General
 Saunders, Stephen (RN) Jane's Fighting Ships 2003-2004

External links

 2000TD product page at Griffon Hoverwork
 2400TD product page at Griffon Hoverwork

Hovercraft
Landing craft
Military hovercraft
Articles containing video clips